The year 1710 in music involved some significant musical events and new works.

Events
April 18 – Probable date of the première of Johann Sebastian Bach's St Mark Passion pastiche at the chapel of Wilhelmsburg Castle (two movements by Bach).
In Britain, the Academy of Vocal Music is founded by Johann Christoph Pepusch and others.

Published popular music
Collier, John Payne (ed.). A Book of Roxburghe Ballads (containing 1,341 broadside ballads, including "Fare Thee Well")

Classical music 
Louis-Nicolas Clérambault  
Cantates françoises, Book 1
Premier livre d'orgue contenant deux suites
Georg Frideric Handel – incidental music for The Alchemist
Michel de la Barre – Pièces pour la flûte traversière, Livre 1
Jean Baptiste Loeillet of Ghent – 12 Recorder Sonatas, Op. 1
Johann Pachelbel – Magnificat Fugue, P.268
James Paisible – The Royall Galliarde. Mr. Isaac's new dance, made for Her Majesty's Birth Day, 1710...
Johann Christoph Pepusch – 6 English Cantatas, Book 1
Johann Schenk – L'écho du Danube, Op .9
Johann Christian Schickhardt 
7 Recorder Sonatas, Op. 1
6 Oboe Sonatas, Op. 8
6 Sonatas à 4, Op. 14
 Jean Baptiste Senaillé – 10 Violin Sonatas, Op. 1
Giuseppe Valentini – Concerto a Quattro Violini (12 concerti grossi), Op. 7 (Rome)

Opera
Floriano Arresti – L'enigma disciolta
Antonio Maria Bononcini – Tigrane, re d'Armenia
André Campra – Les Fêtes vénitiennes
Pietro Paolo Laurenti – Sabella mrosa d'Truvlin
Johann Mattheson – Boris Goudenow

Births 
January 4 – Giovanni Battista Pergolesi, composer, violinist and organist (died 1736)
March 12 – Thomas Arne, composer (died 1778)
March 27 – Joseph Abaco, violoncellist and composer (died 1805)
April 12 – Caffarelli, castrato singer (died 1783)
November 22 – Wilhelm Friedemann Bach, composer, eldest son of Johann Sebastian Bach (died 1784)
date unknown
James Oswald, composer and music publisher (died 1769)
Giovanni Battista Ferrandini, composer (died 1791)
Thomas Gladwin, organist and composer (died 1799)
Anton Joseph Hampel, horn player (died 1771)
George Alexander Stevens, actor, poet and songwriter (died 1780)

Deaths 
May 10 – Georg Dietrich Leyding, organist and composer (born 1664)
June 14 – Johann Friedrich Alberti, German composer and organist (born 1642)
July 8 – Juan García de Salazar, choral composer (b. 1639)
September 26 – Cardinal Vincenzo Grimani, opera librettist
November 22 – Bernardo Pasquini, composer (born 1637)
date unknown
Charles Mouton, composer and lutenist (born c. 1626)
Gaspar Sanz, priest and composer (born 1640)
probable
Rosa Giacinta Badalla, Benedictine nun and composer (born c.1660)
Marcus Meibomius, historian of music (born c. 1630)
Camilla de Rossi, composer

References

 
18th century in music
Music by year